Respighi may refer to:

 Ottorino Respighi (1879–1936), Italian musician and composer 
 Elsa Respighi (née Olivieri-Sangiacomo) (1894–1996), also a composer, wife of Ottorino Respighi
 Pietro Respighi (1843–1913), Cardinal of the Roman Catholic Church
 Lorenzo Respighi (1824–1889), Italian astronomer, mathematician, and natural philosopher
Respighi (crater), named after the astronomer
 Emilio Respighi, (1860-1936) Italian dermatologist